is the first major single from the Japanese pop group Cute, released on February 21, 2007 under the Zetima label. This single was the first debut single by a female idol group to enter the charts within the top five positions (reaching the number 3 spot on the daily chart, and number 5 on the weekly chart), and the youngest group to rank within the top 10.

The CD single appeared in two versions: Regular Edition and Limited Edition, the latter with an additional DVD. The first press of the limited edition contained an event ticket draw card with a serial number.

Track listing

External links 
 Sakura Chirari entry on the Up-Front Works official website
 Sakura Chirari at the official Hello! Project discography (Japanese)

Charts

References 

2007 singles
Japanese-language songs
Cute (Japanese idol group) songs
Songs written by Tsunku
Song recordings produced by Tsunku
Zetima Records singles
2007 songs
Songs about cherry blossom